Vasoconstriction is the narrowing of the blood vessels resulting from contraction of the muscular wall of the vessels, in particular the large arteries and small arterioles. The process is the opposite of vasodilation, the widening of blood vessels. The process is particularly important in controlling hemorrhage and reducing acute blood loss. When blood vessels constrict, the flow of blood is restricted or decreased, thus retaining body heat or increasing vascular resistance.  This makes the skin turn paler because less blood reaches the surface, reducing the radiation of heat. On a larger level, vasoconstriction is one mechanism by which the body regulates and maintains mean arterial pressure.

Medications causing vasoconstriction, also known as vasoconstrictors, are one type of medicine used to raise blood pressure. Generalized vasoconstriction usually results in an increase in systemic blood pressure, but it may also occur in specific tissues, causing a localized reduction in blood flow. The extent of vasoconstriction may be slight or severe depending on the substance or circumstance. Many vasoconstrictors also cause pupil dilation. Medications that cause vasoconstriction include: antihistamines, decongestants, and stimulants. Severe vasoconstriction may result in symptoms of intermittent claudication.

General mechanism
The mechanism that leads to vasoconstriction results from the increased concentration of calcium (Ca2+ ions) within vascular smooth muscle cells. However, the specific mechanisms for generating an increased intracellular concentration of calcium depends on the vasoconstrictor. Smooth muscle cells are capable of generating action potentials, but this mechanism is rarely utilized for contraction in the vasculature. Hormonal or pharmacokinetic components are more physiologically relevant. Two common stimuli for eliciting smooth muscle contraction are circulating epinephrine and activation of the sympathetic nervous system (through release of norepinephrine) that directly innervates the muscle. These compounds interact with cell surface adrenergic receptors. Such stimuli result in a signal transduction cascade that leads to increased intracellular calcium from the sarcoplasmic reticulum through IP3-mediated calcium release, as well as enhanced calcium entry across the sarcolemma through calcium channels. The rise in intracellular calcium complexes with calmodulin, which in turn activates myosin light-chain kinase. This enzyme is responsible for phosphorylating the light chain of myosin to stimulate cross-bridge cycling.

Once elevated, the intracellular calcium concentration is returned to its normal concentration through a variety of protein pumps and calcium exchangers located on the plasma membrane and sarcoplasmic reticulum. This reduction in calcium removes the stimulus necessary for contraction, allowing for a return to baseline.

Causes
Factors that trigger vasoconstriction can be exogenous or endogenous in origin. Ambient temperature is an example of exogenous vasoconstriction. Cutaneous vasoconstriction will occur because of the body's exposure to the severe cold. Examples of endogenous factors include the autonomic nervous system, circulating hormones, and intrinsic mechanisms inherent to the vasculature itself (also referred to as the myogenic response).

Examples
Examples include stimulants, amphetamines, and antihistamines. Many are used in medicine to treat hypotension and as topical decongestants. Vasoconstrictors are also used clinically to increase blood pressure or to reduce local blood flow. Vasoconstrictors mixed with local anesthetics are used to increase the duration of local anesthesia by constricting the blood vessels, thereby safely concentrating the anesthetic agent for an extended duration, as well as reducing hemorrhage.

The routes of administration vary. They may be both systemic and topical. For example, pseudoephedrine is taken orally and phenylephrine is topically applied to the nasal passages or eyes.

Examples include:

Endogenous
Vasoconstriction is a procedure of the body that averts orthostatic hypotension. It is part of a body negative feedback loop in which the body tries to restore homeostasis (maintain constant internal environment).

For example, vasoconstriction is a hypothermic preventative in which the blood vessels constrict and blood must move at a higher pressure to actively prevent a hypoxic reaction. ATP is used as a form of energy to increase this pressure to heat the body. Once homeostasis is restored, the blood pressure and ATP production regulates. Vasoconstriction also occurs in superficial blood vessels of warm-blooded animals when their ambient environment is cold; this process diverts the flow of heated blood to the center of the animal, preventing the loss of heat.

Pathology
Vasoconstriction can be a contributing factor to erectile dysfunction. An increase in blood flow to the penis causes an erection.

Improper vasoconstriction may also play a role in secondary hypertension.

See also

 Addison's disease
 Inotrope
 Hypertension
 Nitric oxide
 Pheochromocytoma
 Shock
 Vasodilation
 Postural orthostatic tachycardia syndrome
 Hemostasis

References

External links

 Definition of Vasoconstriction on HealthScout
 Cannabis arteritis revisited--ten new case reports
 Are coronary heart disease and peripheral arterial disease associated with tobacco or cannabis consumption

 
Cardiovascular physiology